Empty Days is a 1999 French drama film written and directed by Marion Vernoux and starring Valeria Bruni Tedeschi. 

The film was entered into the main competition at the 56th Venice International Film Festival, winning the President of the Italian Senate's Gold Medal.

Plot

Cast 

 Valeria Bruni Tedeschi as Marie Del Sol
 Patrick Dell'Isola as Pierre Perset
 Sergi López  as Luis
 Florence Thomassin  as  Sophie
 Chloé Mons as Catherine
 Alexandre Carrière as  Hervé
 Rachid Bouali as  le serveur du café
 Annette Lowcay as  la caissière du supermarché
 Marco Cherqui as  Antoine
  Antoine Mathieu as Martineau
 Éric Caravaca  as  le jeune homme du bus 
 Dodine Herry as  la directrice des Ressources Humaines

References

External links

  
French drama films 
1999 drama films
1999 films
Films directed by Marion Vernoux
1990s French-language films
1990s French films